Johnsville is an unincorporated community in Bradley County, Arkansas, United States.

References

Unincorporated communities in Arkansas
Unincorporated communities in Bradley County, Arkansas